Cagnano is a municipality in the Haute-Corse department, Corsica.

Cagnano may also refer to:

Places in Italy
Cagnano Amiterno, a municipality in the Province of L'Aquila, Abruzzo.
Cagnano Varano, a municipality in the Province of Foggia, Apulia.
Pontecagnano Faiano, a town and municipality in the Province of Salerno, Campania.